Dan Green is an Elite  American powerlifter and owner of both Boss Barbell Club and Mountain View Fitness in Mountain View, California. His best competition lifts in the 242 lb (110 kg) weight class are an 848 lb (385 kg) squat, a 530 lb (240 kg) bench press, and an 837.5 lb (380 kg) deadlift. His best powerlifting meet total at 242 lbs is 2210 lb (1002.5 kg). His best competition lifts in the 220 lb (100 kg) weight class are an 837.5 lb (380 kg) squat, a 501 lb (227.5 kg) bench press, and an 827 lb (375 kg) deadlift. His best total at 220 lbs is 2110 lbs (957.5 kg).

World records
Weight Class: 220 lbs
 Raw Squat without Wraps: 783 lbs 
 Raw Total without Wraps: 2099 lbs 
Weight Class: 242 lbs
 Raw Total with and without Wraps: 2210 lbs 
 Raw Total without Wraps: 2083 lbs

Achievements
Named number 20 in the top 50 World's fittest male athletes in 2014 by Men's Health magazine.

Boss Barbell Club
Dan Green is the owner of Boss Barbell Club in Mountain View, California where he is also a Personal Trainer.

See also
 List of powerlifters

References

External links
Interview with Dan Green
Official Boss Barbell Club Website
Dan Green's instagram account

American powerlifters
American strength athletes
Living people
Year of birth missing (living people)